The 1992–93 Slovenian PrvaLiga was the second season of Slovenian top division football. The season started on 15 August 1992 and ended on 9 June 1993 with each team playing a total of 34 matches.

League table

Results

Top goalscorers

See also
1992–93 Slovenian Football Cup
1992–93 Slovenian Second League

References
General

External links
Official website of the PrvaLiga 

Slovenian PrvaLiga seasons
Slovenia
1992–93 in Slovenian football